Pretty in Pink is a 1986 American film.

Pretty in Pink may also refer to:

Music
 "Pretty in Pink" (song), a 1981 song by The Psychedelic Furs, re-recorded in 1986 for a film with the same name
 "Pretty in Pink", a song from the album After the Lights by Sweetbox
 Pretty in Pink, an album by Seagull Screaming Kiss Her Kiss Her
 Pretty in Pink, a girl group featuring producer Maurissa Tancharoen

Film and television
 Pretty in Pink, an AVN Award-nominated all-girl pornographic film
 "Pretty in Pink", an episode of the reality show Newport Harbor: The Real Orange County
 "Pretty in Pink", an episode of The Cat in the Hat Knows a Lot About That!

Computing
 Pretty in Pink, a computer software game by Legacy Games

See also
 Prettier in Pink, an album by Prettier Than Pink
 Pretty in Puke, an EP by The Giraffes
 "Pretty in Punk", a song by Fall Out Boy
 Pretty in Black, an album by The Raveonettes
 "Petty in Pink", an episode of Gossip Girl, a television series